Sorry If I Call You Love is a 2014 Spanish romance film directed by Joaquín Llamas based on the novel by Federico Moccia. It stars Paloma Bloyd and Daniele Liotti.

Cast

Production 
Penned by Fran Araújo and Manuel Burque, the screenplay is an adaptation of the novel by Federico Moccia. The film is a Telecinco Cinema production. Shooting locations included Barcelona and Cadaqués.

Release 
Distributed by Emon, the film was theatrically released in Spain on 20 June 2014.

Reception 
Pere Vall of Fotogramas gave the film a negative review and 2 out of 5 stars, singling out as the only positive points (among laughable scenes galore) Bloyd and her character's female friends, Chiapella, Omedes' cinematography and the Barcelona setting. 

Jonathan Holland of The Hollywood Reporter deemed the film to be "a slick, blandly superficial forbidden love fantasy with a carefully calibrated lack of knowingness that lends it a certain appeal".

See also 
 List of Spanish films of 2014

References

External links 

2014 romance films
Spanish romance films
2010s Spanish-language films
Films based on Italian novels
Telecinco Cinema films
Films shot in the province of Girona
Films shot in Barcelona
2010s Spanish films